Ramzi Abid (born March 24, 1980) is a  Canadian former professional ice hockey player of Tunisian descent, who played in the National Hockey League (NHL) with the Phoenix Coyotes, Pittsburgh Penguins, Atlanta Thrashers and the Nashville Predators.

Playing career
As a youth, Abid played in the 1994 Quebec International Pee-Wee Hockey Tournament with a minor ice hockey team from Longueuil, Quebec.

Typically playing as a left winger, Ramzi Abid was selected by the Colorado Avalanche as the first choice in the second round (28th overall) of the 1998 NHL Entry Draft and was redrafted in the 2000 NHL Entry Draft, 85th overall, by the Phoenix Coyotes, who on March 11, 2003, traded him to the Pittsburgh Penguins with Dan Focht and Guillaume Lefebvre for Jan Hrdina and François Leroux .

In March 2003, he successfully underwent surgery to repair a torn ACL and missed the remainder of the 2002–03 season. He played for the Wilkes-Barre/Scranton Penguins, an affiliate team of the Pittsburgh Penguins, in the American Hockey League during the 2004–05 NHL lockout. Abid spent the 2005–06 season with the Atlanta Thrashers.

On July 21, 2006, Abid signed a one-year contract with the Nashville Predators. Abid had an impressive pre-season, in which he scored a hat-trick in an 8-1 win over the Blue Jackets on September 21, 2006. Abid was then sent to affiliate, the Milwaukee Admirals, prior to the start of the 2006-07 season. Abid played 13 games with the Predators as an injury replacement during the season. On April 18, 2007, Ramzi was called up to the Predators and made his play-off debut against the San Jose Sharks in the Western Conference Quarterfinals.

Abid was a member of Team Canada in the 2007 Spengler Cup. In 2007, Abid signed with SC Bern to play through the 2009-10 season. He played two seasons for SC Bern before his contract was dissolved in April 2009.

In August 2009, he signed with Traktor Chelyabinsk of the Kontinental Hockey League for the 2009–10 season. After 33 games with Traktor he left the KHL on January 31, 2010. On February 1, 2010, Abid agreed to a contract with Rögle BK.

On June 11, 2010, Abid again a free agent, signed a one-year contract with EC Red Bull Salzburg that also included a one-year option, a team playing in the EBEL.

After a second season with Red Bull, Abid was again on the move within Europe, signing a one-year contract with JYP of the Finnish SM-liiga on July 23, 2012. In his first season with the Finnish club, Abid contributed with a team leading 22 goals and 42 points in 56 games and was signed to a one-year extension at the midpoint of the season.

Abid struggled in his return campaign in 2013–14 with JYP, posting 3 goals in 21 games before he was mutually released from his contract and signed in the German DEL with Grizzly Adams Wolfsburg on December 18, 2013.

Career statistics

Awards and honours

Transactions
 On June 27, 1998 the Colorado Avalanche drafted Ramzi Abid in the second-round (#28 overall) of the 1998 NHL draft.
 On June 24, 2000 the Phoenix Coyotes drafted Ramzi Abid in the third-round (#85 overall) of the 2000 NHL draft.
 On July 24, 2000 the Phoenix Coyotes signed Ramzi Abid to a 3-year contract.
 On March 11, 2003 the Phoenix Coyotes traded Ramzi Abid, Dan Focht and Guillaume Lefebvre to the Pittsburgh Penguins in exchange for Jan Hrdina and Francois Leroux.
 On September 11, 2003 the Pittsburgh Penguins resigned Ramzi Abid.
 On August 3, 2004 the Pittsburgh Penguins resigned Ramzi Abid.
 On August 8, 2005 the Atlanta Thrashers signed unrestricted free agent Ramzi Abid.
 On July 21, 2006 the Nashville Predators signed unrestricted free agent Ramzi Abid to a 1-year contract.
 On July 10, 2007 the SC Bern signed Ramzi Abid.

References

External links
 

1980 births
Acadie–Bathurst Titan players
Arizona Coyotes draft picks
Atlanta Thrashers players
Canadian expatriate ice hockey players in Sweden
Canadian expatriate ice hockey players in Switzerland
Canadian ice hockey left wingers
Canadian people of Scottish descent
Canadian people of Tunisian descent
Colorado Avalanche draft picks
Chicago Wolves players
Chicoutimi Saguenéens (QMJHL) players
EC Red Bull Salzburg players
Grizzlys Wolfsburg players
Halifax Mooseheads players
Ice hockey people from Montreal
JYP Jyväskylä players
Living people
Milwaukee Admirals players
Nashville Predators players
Phoenix Coyotes players
Pittsburgh Penguins players
Rögle BK players
SC Bern players
SC Rapperswil-Jona Lakers players
Springfield Falcons players
Traktor Chelyabinsk players
Wilkes-Barre/Scranton Penguins players
Canadian expatriate ice hockey players in Austria
Canadian expatriate ice hockey players in Russia
Canadian expatriate ice hockey players in Finland
Canadian expatriate ice hockey players in Germany